Teškoto or Teshkoto ("the hard one"), is one of the most beautiful folk dances from western Macedonia, specifically from the Mijak ethnographic region. The dance represents the hard life that people had in this region. Its origins come from the period when the locals were leaving their motherland to go out of the country for better life but over the years it has also grown as a symbol for all the pain caused in this region in the past. This folk dance has inspired many artists and poets (for example Blaze Koneski's poem Teškoto).

References

Macedonian dances